Serena Williams defeated her sister Venus Williams in the final, 6–4, 6–4 to win the women's singles tennis title at the 2017 Australian Open. It was her seventh Australian Open singles title and her 23rd and last major singles title overall, surpassing Steffi Graf as the Open Era leader in women's singles major titles. Serena did not lose a set during the tournament. This marked the first time the Williams sisters contested a major final since the 2009 Wimbledon Championships, the first time they contested the Australian Open final since 2003, and their ninth meeting in a major final overall. At , Serena became the oldest woman to win the major surpassing Martina Navratilova in the 1990 Wimbledon Championships. With the win, Serena also regained the world No. 1 singles ranking. Serena was roughly 8-weeks pregnant with her first daughter, Alexis Olympia Ohanian Jr., by the end of the tournament. It was Venus' first major final since the 2009 Wimbledon Championships.

Angelique Kerber was the defending champion, but lost in the fourth round to CoCo Vandeweghe. 

Mirjana Lučić-Baroni reached her second major semifinal 18 years after her first at the 1999 Wimbledon Championships.

Seeds 
 
  Angelique Kerber (fourth round)
  Serena Williams (champion)
  Agnieszka Radwańska (second round)
  Simona Halep (first round)
  Karolína Plíšková (quarterfinals)
  Dominika Cibulková (third round)
  Garbiñe Muguruza (quarterfinals)
  Svetlana Kuznetsova (fourth round)
  Johanna Konta (quarterfinals)
  Carla Suárez Navarro (second round)
  Elina Svitolina (third round)
  Timea Bacsinszky (third round)
  Venus Williams (final)
  Elena Vesnina (third round)
  Roberta Vinci (first round)
  Barbora Strýcová (fourth round)

  Caroline Wozniacki (third round)
  Samantha Stosur (first round)
  Kiki Bertens (first round)
  Zhang Shuai (second round)
  Caroline Garcia (third round)
  Daria Gavrilova (fourth round)
  Daria Kasatkina (first round)
  Anastasia Pavlyuchenkova (quarterfinals)
  Tímea Babos (first round)
  Laura Siegemund (first round)
  Irina-Camelia Begu (second round)
  Alizé Cornet (second round)
  Monica Puig (second round)
  Ekaterina Makarova (fourth round)
  Yulia Putintseva (second round)
  Anastasija Sevastova (third round)

Draw

Finals

Top half

Section 1

Section 2

Section 3

Section 4

Bottom half

Section 5

Section 6

Section 7

Section 8

Seeded players
The following are the seeded players and notable players who withdrew from the event. Seeding are arranged according to rankings on 9 January 2017, while ranking and points before are as of 16 January 2017.

The following players would have been seeded, but they withdrew or not entered from the event.

Other entry information

Wildcards

Protected ranking

Qualifiers

Lucky losers

Withdrawals 

& – not included on entry list
† – withdrew from entry list

Retirements

Championship match statistics

See also
 2017 Australian Open Series

Notes

References

External links
Women drawsheet on ausopen.com
 2017 Australian Open – Women's draws and results at the International Tennis Federation

Women's Singles
2017
2017 in Australian women's sport
2017 WTA Tour